Kalus is a village in West Azerbaijan Province, Iran.

Kalus may also refer to:
 Kalus-e Markazi, Kohgiluyeh and Boyer-Ahmad Province
 Kalus-e Olya, Kohgiluyeh and Boyer-Ahmad Province
 Kalus-e Sofla, Kohgiluyeh and Boyer-Ahmad Province
 Kalus-e Vosta, Kohgiluyeh and Boyer-Ahmad Province
 Ashley Kalus, businesswoman and former director of public engagement for Illinois governor Bruce Rauner